"Tonightless" is the first single from Eighteen Visions' self-titled album. The CD was not released as a single, but rather as a promo, for radio, and collectors, along with an accompanying music video.

Charts

Track listing
"Tonightless (Single Version)" (3:59)

References

2006 singles
Eighteen Visions songs
2006 songs
Trustkill Records singles